SMarteenies is a spin off of the children's art programme SMart designed for pre school viewers. It was broadcast on the CBeebies channel daily from the channel's launch in February 2002. The series remained repeated until its suspension in January 2008, following the death of presenter Mark Speight's fiancée Natasha Collins, and his subsequent suicide.

The programme started with the four presenters determining who was to do the first piece (with the rhyme: "Eeny, meeny, miny, moe, Smarteenies guess who'll have a go"). Following each piece, the programme returned to this screen to select the next presenter.

Presenters
The presenters were the same as those who presented the original SMart. The segments the presenters presented alternated every other episode.

Jay Burridge hosted 'Man of Letters', where he wore a postman's cap and carried a messenger bag covered with alphabet letters. The bag contains items and artistic tools all starting with a particular letter of the alphabet which he then uses to produce a piece of art. The other segment he hosted is where he demonstrates effective methods to make pictures like coloured pencils, wax crayons and so on. He wears a dark blue T-shirt.
Lizi Botham (Bizi Lizi) hosted a segment where she uses her fingerprints to create pictures on the camera lens. These would appear three times throughout the episode. The other segment she hosted was where she visits a group of children at a school and makes something. She wears a yellow T-shirt.
Kirsten O'Brien appeared in a segment featuring the puppet Doogy the Dog (played by Marcus Clarke). Doogy normally goes out in his little blue car called his Doogymobile to get things for Kirsten. Her other segment was Pattern Palace, where she uses different art media to create fun and colourful patterns. She wears a pale blue T-shirt.
Mark Speight hosted the "Shape Store" segment. In it he would make pictures out of different shapes. His other segment was called "Big Picture, Small Picture", where he simultaneously produces a normal-sized and large-scale version of the same scene (e.g. using mops instead of paint brushes for the large version). He wears a red T-shirt and in the Shape Store segment he also wore a brown jacket alongside the T-shirt.

Until its suspension, Speight and O'Brien were the only remaining presenters of the principal show SMart, as Burridge and Botham had left. SMarteenies premiered in February 2002 on CBeebies, and aired in 2006 on CBC Kids in Canada. It also aired on the Australian CBeebies, and is the only channel that still airs the show to this day.

Episodes

External links
 
BBC artbox
BBC's SMart website
Doogy Dog
 

BBC children's television shows
2000s British children's television series
2002 British television series debuts
2008 British television series endings
British preschool education television series
British television shows featuring puppetry
British television spin-offs
CBeebies
Television series by BBC Studios